Cheick Keita (born 2 April 2003) is a French professional footballer who plays as a centre-back for Reims in the French Ligue 1.

Club career
Keita is a youth product of the Reims youth academy. He began his senior career with their reserves in 2020. On 30 October 2022, he made his senior and professional debut with Reims in a 2–1 Ligue 1 win over Auxerre on 23 October 2022.

International career
Born in France, Keita is of Malian descent. He is a youth international for France, having played up to the France U20s.

References

External links
 
 FFF Profile

2003 births
Living people
People from Champigny-sur-Marne
Black French sportspeople
French sportspeople of Malian descent
French footballers
Association football central defenders
France youth international footballers
Ligue 1 players
Championnat National 2 players
Stade de Reims players